The Escadron de Transformation Rafale 3/4 Aquitaine (Rafale Transition Squadron 3/4 Aquitaine) is an Operational conversion unit of the French Air and Space Force (Armée de l'air et de l'espace) flying the Dassault Rafale, based at BA 113 Saint-Dizier – Robinson Air Base.

The unit has taken up the traditions of Escadron de Bombardement 2/92 Aquitaine (EB 2/92 Aquitaine) which operated SNCASO SO-4050 Vautour then CIFAS 328 Aquitaine on  Dassault Mirage IVA.

The squadron was reformed under the designation of Escadron de Transformation Rafale 2/92 Aquitaine on October 6, 2010 at St-Dizier-Robinson, presided over by the then Minister of Défense. The 2/92 Aquitaine was attached as of August 26, 2015 to the 4e Escadre de Chasse which was reformed the same day on the same base.

The unit took the current designation of Escadron de Transformation Rafale 3/4 Aquitaine on September 1, 2016. The squadron operates the Rafales of the French Air and Space Force, and equally operates the Rafale M as part of French Naval Aviation. In 2017, three Rafale M were assigned to the squadron.

History

Cognac

The center of Bombardment instruction - Centre d'Instruction du Bombardement 328 (CIB 328) was established at Cognac. Constituted of a squadron on B-26 Invader and another on CM-170 Magister, SNCASO SO-4050 VautourIIA and Vautour IIB, the mission of the latter was the selection and instruction of future unit crews of the B-26 and the Squadrons of bombardment Vautour.

The 92nd Bombardment Brigade was formed on December 12, 1958 at Cognac. The Escadron de Bombardement 2/92 was created towards the end of 1959. On May 26 195, the squadron retook traditions of the GB I/25 Tunisia and adopted the designation of Escadron de Bombardement 2/92 Aquitaine (the "Tunisia" designation was abandoned after the country became independent).

In addition to the 2/92 of the 92nd Brigade was composed of the CIB 328 and the Escadron de Bombardement 1/92 Bourgogne. The three squadrons operated the twin-seat version of the Vautour IIB, with bombardment at high altitude as its principal mission.

On Vautour to Bordeaux 
Between March and April 1961, the 92nd Brigade was based at Bordeaux-Merignac Air Base.

Four Vautours of the 2/92 were detached one month to Thailand for Southeast Asia Treaty Organisation (SEATO) exercises.

The 92nd Brigade became the 92e Escadre de Bombardement (92e EB) on May 1, 1964, with the 1/92 Bourgogne and 2/92 Aquitaine attached respectively to the unit.

Successive designations 
 Escadron de Bombardement 2/92 Aquitaine: from November 1, 1958 until September 1, 1974 (EB 2/92 Aquitaine)	
 Centre d'instruction des Forces aériennes stratégiques (CIFAS) 328 Aquitaine : from 01/09/1978 to 01/09/1991	
 Centre d'Instruction Tactique (CITAC) 339 Aquitaine : from 05/03/2001 to 30/06/2006 	
 Escadron de Transformation Rafale 2/92 Aquitaine : from 01/06/2010 to 31/08/2015 (ETR 2/92 Aquitaine)
 Escadron de Transformation Rafale 3/4 Aquitaine : as of September 1, 2016 (ETR 3/4)

Successive attachments  
 92e Escadre de Bombardement : from 01/11/1958 to 01/09/1974
 4e Escadre de Chasse : as of 26/08/2015

Escadrilles
 Escadrille 4B3
 Escadrille I/25 (2)
 Escadrille SPA 160 "Diables rouges" (since 1 September 2016)

See also

 List of French Air and Space Force aircraft squadrons

References

Citations

Bibliography
 Historique de la 25e Escadre de Bombardement 25eEB du CIFAS328 "Aquitaine" 1936-1992 - 56 ans d'histoire édité par l'escadron en 1992.

Fighter squadrons of the French Air and Space Force
Military units and formations established in 1958
1958 establishments in France